Colin Maitland (born 12 August 1942) is an English actor who has made several film and television appearances. He is notable for portraying Seth Sawyer, a member of The Dirty Dozen in the 1967 film of that name.

He is married to Amanda, whom he met on a blind date, and appeared on the BBC's Bargain Hunt in November 2017. He also appeared in Lolita (1962) and The Bedford Incident (1965). His television roles include the sound/studio engineer in Shoestring (1979–80).
In 2006 he recounted his experiences on The Dirty Dozen in a documentary Armed and Deadly: The Making of The Dirty Dozen.

Filmography

References

External links

1942 births
English male film actors
English male television actors
Living people